Dana KCM is a private charitable fund founded in 2010 by Dr. Mohamed Nazim Abdul Rahman, a social entrepreneur from Malaysia.

Dana KCM was first created through donations to Kelas Tuisyen Cikgu Mariyam (Teacher Mariyam Tuition Centres) to assist aspiring students to pursue tertiary education. . The fund is currently managed by iConsultants Management Sdn Bhd, a private limited management company based in Kuala Lumpur.

During the initial stage, the fund only serves local students from Malaysia but it now includes foreign students. The fund has grown contributions from Malaysian philanthropists. In 2013, it recorded a total sum of MYR20 million. available for accepted applicants.

References

External links
 http://m.thestar.com.my/story.aspx?hl=Fair+participants+come+out+with+innovative+ways+to+attract+students&sec=news&id=%7B2DE4038B-DA21-4507-9517-27DF17B774B9%7D
 https://web.archive.org/web/20140826115630/http://mybiasiswa.com/biasiswa-2013/biasiswa-dana-kcm-2013

Organizations established in 2010
2010 establishments in Malaysia
Charities based in Malaysia